Ski Party is a 1965 American musical-comedy film directed by Alan Rafkin and starring Frankie Avalon and Dwayne Hickman. It was released by American International Pictures (AIP). Ski Party is considered as a beach party film spin-off, with a change of setting from the beach to the ski slopes – although the final scene places everyone back at the beach.

Plot
Todd Armstrong (Avalon) and Craig Gamble (Hickman) are college undergraduates from California who unsuccessfully date co-eds Linda Hughes (Deborah Walley) and Barbara Norris (Yvonne Craig). Arrogant, handsome, athletic classmate Freddie (Aron Kincaid) has no such problems and chooses not to resist all the women chasing after him. As president of the Ski Club, Freddie organizes a midterm vacation trip to ski country (in Sawtooth National Forest) in Idaho. Although they know nothing about skiing, Todd and Craig follow Linda and Barbara on this bus trip to try to learn "the secret of Freddie's technique".

Once at the rustic ski resort, Todd and Craig pose as frumpy, non-threatening, young English women, Jane and Nora. When not interrupted by a mysterious ice-skating, yodeling polar bear or toying with psychologically imbalanced and lederhosen-clad lodge manager Mr. Pevney (Robert Q. Lewis), they observe the girls in their group to learn how to succeed with women and learn how they have gone wrong.

To make Linda jealous, Todd attracts the attention of gorgeous, curvy Swedish ski instructor Nita (Bobbi Shaw) when he's dressed as himself. However, Freddie becomes obsessed with Craig when Craig is dressed as a woman, not accustomed to girls who play "hard to get". Nita persuades Todd, over Freddie's goading, to compete in a ski jump against Freddie. Todd's jump forces Craig to shoot him down, resulting in a broken leg.

Todd crawls through miles of deep snow late at night with his broken leg covered in a plaster cast, to Nita's house. Toting a bottle, he learns that Nita is not the exotic minx she pretends to be, but aspires to be treated like an "American girl", that is, with much "talk" and little "action".

Back at the lodge, Freddie, still obsessed with Craig's "female" Nora tries to break down Nora's room door. Stuck inside, Todd and Craig contemplate their next move as they escape through a window. Somehow, they hail a taxi and rack up an enormous fare to Santa Monica, California. Freddie follows on a moped  that is piloted by fur-coated lodge manager Pevney. The rest of the group abruptly ends its spring break and follows behind on the bus.

Todd, Linda, Craig, and Barbara arrive, with the rest of the group and Pevney, at Todd's parents' beachfront house. There, the two couples share their true feelings, and the boys surprise the girls with their ruse.

Delusional Freddie runs into the Pacific Ocean, calling to his beloved Nora, after Craig tells him that when she heard Freddie was coming, she started swimming: By now, she is "somewhere between here and Japan." Craig encourages Freddie to hurry; maybe he can catch her "somewhere near Guam".

"Pretty mean thing to do," Craig says to the audience, reassuring us that they will tell Freddie everything tomorrow. "If he comes back..."

Cast

 Frankie Avalon as Todd Armstrong
 Dwayne Hickman as Craig Gamble
 Deborah Walley as Linda Hughes
 Yvonne Craig as Barbara Norris
 Robert Q. Lewis as Mr. Pevney
 Bobbi Shaw as Nita Elksberg
 Aron Kincaid as Freddie Carter
 The Hondells as themselves
 Steven Rogers as Gene
 Patti Chandler as Janet

 Michael Nader as Bobby
 Salli Sachse as Indian
 John Boyer as John
 Mikki Jamison as Mikki
 Mickey Dora as Mickey
 Mary Hughes as Mary
 Bill Sampson as Arthur
 Luree Holmes as Luree
 Lesley Gore as herself
 James Brown & The Famous Flames (Bobby Byrd, Bobby Bennett, and Lloyd Stallworth) as themselves

Cast notes
 Annette Funicello contributes an opening cameo  as the boys' desirable but modestly dressed Professor Sonya Roberts. 
 Avalon and Hickman appeared together again – after trading their character names with each other – in AIP's Dr. Goldfoot and the Bikini Machine.
 Meredith MacRae appeared (uncredited) as the girl on the bus behind Lesley Gore.

Production
In December 1964, AIP announced the film would follow Beach Blanket Bingo, then be followed by How to Stuff a Wild Bikini. James H. Nicholson and Sam Arkoff hired Gene Corman to produce after watching The Girls on the Beach. Corman hired the director, Alan Rafkin, and writer, Robert Kaufman, from television.

Dwayne Hickman made the film immediately after Cat Ballou and for the same salary. He later wrote "it may have seemed like a strange career decision to go from a classic comedy Western like Cat Ballou to an AIP date movie like Ski Party but at the time Cat was really just a B movie for Columbia."

Hickman says he "hit it off immediately" with co star Avalon "and decided that we should play the characters like Hope and Crosby. Frankie would be the Crosby-like character, smart, in-charge and slick, while I would play the Hope role and be the bumbler. We added a lot of physical business which helped a not very imaginative script."

AIP wanted John Ashley to play Freddy, but Corman felt he looked too much like Avalon. The producer instead cast Aaron Kincaid, who had been in Corman's previous two beach films.

Los Angeles City College (a two-year institution in East Hollywood) was the location used for the unnamed university in the film. The outdoor snow scenes were filmed in and around Sun Valley, Idaho over three weeks, and the film gives screen credit to Idaho's Sawtooth National Forest. Ski instructor Siegfried Engl has a cameo. There were also some scenes shot at the beach.

In March 1965, one week into filming, AIP were so happy with the rushes that they announced Kaufman, Corman and Rafkin would make Cruise Party immediately. Cruise Party never was produced.

James Brown said he "felt like [he] was in a straitjacket" during his appearance.

Hickman said making the film "was a totally enjoyable experience", and AIP offered him a lead role in How to Stuff a Wild Bikini. The studio reunited him and Avalon in Dr Goldfoot and the Bikini Machine with Hickman's playing Armstrong and Avalon's playing Gamble.

Music
Ski Party is punctuated with musical numbers by Lesley Gore, who sings Marvin Hamlisch's "Sunshine, Lollipops, and Rainbows" on the bus, and James Brown & The Famous Flames (Bobby Byrd, Lloyd Stallworth, and Bobby Bennett) who sing and shimmy through "I Got You (I Feel Good)" in the lodge, having been humorously cast as the "white bread" resort's all-black ski patrol. (In the bio-pic Get On Up, the scene from Ski Party is re-created, with Brown's bemoaning that he is splitting his pants "in front of all these white folks".)

The Hondells sing two songs written by Gary Usher and Roger Christian – the title track, off-camera, then appearing in beach attire for the closing track, "The Gasser", on Sorrento Beach in Santa Monica].

Avalon sings the surf-rock "Lots, Lots More" (by Richie Adams and Larry Kusik), and is joined by Hickman, Walley and Craig for the Holiday-styled "Paintin' the Town" (written by Bob Gaudio of The Four Seasons).

Walley and Craig sing "We'll Never Change Them", a song by Guy Hemric and Jerry Styner, originally written as "I'll Never Change Him" and sung by Annette Funicello in a scene cut from Beach Blanket Bingo.

This is the only AIP beach party film not scored by Les Baxter. Edwin Norton is credited as the film's music editor and Al Simms as music supervisor.

Reception

Critical
The Los Angeles Times wrote the dialogue "seems awfully childish even for teenagers", but liked the musical acts.

Box Office
Samuel Arkoff of AIP stated the film was a commercial disappointment. A follow-up film announced in the credits, Cruise Party, never was made.

Both Columbia Pictures and Universal Studios produced their versions of snowbound beach party films: Columbia's Winter a Go-Go was released four months later in October 1965, and Universal's Wild Wild Winter was released in January 1966.

Merchandising
Dell Comics published a 12-cent comic book version of Ski Party in conjunction with the movie's release.

Home media
Ski Party was released to DVD by MGM Home Video on April 15, 2003 as part of a double-sided disc, with Ski Party on side two of the disc and on July 10, 2007 as part of the box set The Frankie and Annette Collection, with Ski Party on the fourth disc.

See also
 List of American films of 1965

References

Notes

External links
 
 
 
 
 
 Article on film at Cinema Retro

1965 films
1965 musical comedy films
1960s teen films
American International Pictures films
American musical comedy films
American teen films
Beach party films
1960s English-language films
Films adapted into comics
Films directed by Alan Rafkin
Films produced by Gene Corman
Films set in Sun Valley, Idaho
Films shot in Sun Valley, Idaho
Films shot in Los Angeles
American skiing films
1960s American films